Imperial Noble Consort Chunque (December 1689 or January 1690 – 27 January 1785), from the Han Chinese Geng clan, was a consort of Yongzheng Emperor.

Life

Family background
Imperial Noble Consort Chunque came from Han Chinese Geng clan (耿氏). Her personal name is unknown.

 Father: Dejin (德金), served as an official in the Ministry of Internal Affairs (内管领).

Kangxi era
Lady Geng was born in twelfth lunar month of twenty eighth year of Kangxi Emperor, which translates to December 1689 in the Gregorian calendar. In 1704, she became a mistress of Kangxi Emperor's fourth son. On 5 January 1712, she gave birth to Yinzhen's fifth son, Hongzhou.

Yongzheng era
The Kangxi Emperor died on 20 December 1722 and was succeeded by Yinzhen, who was enthroned as the Yongzheng Emperor. In 1723, Lady Geng was given a title of "Concubine Yu" (裕嫔; "yu" meaning "prosperous"). In 1730, she was promoted to "Consort Yu" (裕妃).

Qianlong era
The Yongzheng Emperor died on 8 October 1735 and was succeeded by Hongli, who was enthroned as the Qianlong Emperor. The same year she was elevated to "Dowager Noble Consort Yu" (裕贵太妃). After the death of Empress Dowager Chongqing in 1778, Dowager Noble Consort Yu was promoted to "Dowager Imperial Noble Consort Yu" (裕皇貴太妃). She died of illness on 27 January 1785 at the age of ninety six. She was posthumously granted the title "Imperial Noble Consort Chunque" (纯悫皇贵妃, "chunque" meaning "pure and honest"). She was interred in the Tai Mausoleum in Western Qing tombs. She is the longest surviving consort of Yongzheng Emperor.

Titles
 During the reign of the Kangxi Emperor (r. 1661–1722):
 Lady Geng (from December 1689)
 Mistress (from 1704)
 During the reign of the Yongzheng Emperor (r. 1722–1735):
 Concubine Yu (from 1722), fifth rank consort 
 Consort Yu (from 1730), fourth rank consort 
 During the reign of the Qianlong Emperor (r. 1735–1796):
 Dowager Noble Consort Yu (from 1735/1736), third rank consort 
 Dowager Imperial Noble Consort Yu,  second rank consort 
 Imperial Noble Consort Chunque (from 28 January 1785)

Issue
 As mistress:
 Hongzhou, Prince Hegong of the First Rank (和硕和恭亲王 弘昼;5 January 1712 - September 1770)

In fiction and popular culture
Portrayed by Li Yijuan in Empresses in the Palace
Portrayed by Bai Shan in Story of Yanxi Palace

See also
 Ranks of imperial consorts in China#Qing
 Royal and noble ranks of the Qing dynasty

References

Consorts of the Yongzheng Emperor